Platyscelidae is a family of amphipods belonging to the order Amphipoda.

Genera:
 Dithyrus Dana, 1852
 Hemityphis Claus, 1879
 Paratyphis Claus, 1879
 Platyscelus Spence Bate, 1861
 Tetrathyrus Claus, 1879

References

Amphipoda